Fetish Records was a British independent record label. Its artist roster consisted of largely early industrial, experimental, and post-punk groups. It was also a home to the early works of graphic designer Neville Brody, who created artwork for releases as art director for the label.

History
Rod Pearce founded the label in 1978 and reissued Throbbing Gristle's debut release The Second Annual Report after its initial pressing on the group's own Industrial Records had sold out. Fetish's final release was the compilation album The Last Testament in 1983, which featured a sleeve note written by Jon Savage.

Artists

See also
 List of record labels

References

External links
 
 Throbbing Gristle discographies

British independent record labels
Record labels established in 1978
Defunct record labels of the United Kingdom
Record labels disestablished in 1983